Here are the Saint Vincent and the Grenadines national football team fixtures and results.

Fixtures

Results

References
{{cite web | title=ST. VINCENT / GRENADINES

National association football team results
Results